Whitecross is an American Christian metal band from Illinois, formed in 1985 by singer Scott Wenzel and guitarist Rex Carroll, and re-formed in 2000. The band won three Dove Awards in the 1990s.

History
Whitecross formed in 1985 in Waukegan, Illinois, releasing their first recording in 1987. Their early albums, which often invite comparisons to Ratt, are laced with fast, technical guitar work. In 1994, Rex Carroll split with lead vocalist Scott Wenzel. Wenzel retained the use of the name "Whitecross" while Carroll went on to form King James with Jimi Bennett (see below). At this point the band's sound underwent a drastic change.

Whitecross has won three Dove Awards with Triumphant Return (in 1990) and In the Kingdom (in 1992) winning "Metal Album of the Year" and Come unto the Light from the Unveiled album winning "Hard Music Recorded Song of the Year" at the 25th GMA Dove Awards in 1994.

In 1994 prior to work starting on the Unveiled album, guitarist Rex Carroll left to form the band King James and pursue other musical ventures. In 1998, singer Scott Wenzel took a two-year break to do mission work in Paraguay, South America. During this time, Whitecross went on hiatus before re-emerging at Cornerstone Festival in 2000 when Carroll and Wenzel re-formed the band with Carroll, Wenzel, Michael Feighan and newcomer Benny Ramos providing bass, keyboards and vocals. Finally having achieved a long-sought lineup stability, the band started performing on a regular basis.

In 2005, the band went back into the studio to record Nineteen Eighty Seven, which featured re-recordings of nine of the ten songs from the band's self-titled debut album (You're Mine being the exclusion), as well as a re-recording of the song Love on the Line (previously unavailable on CD) and a new guitar instrumental by Rex Carroll.

On April 5, 2008, they played at the Legends of Rock festival in Ennepetal, Germany. Beginning in July 2008, they played the first of several short tours in Guatemala featuring shows in Guatemala City, Panajachel, Huehuetenango and other cities.

In 2017, Carroll and Feighan joined with David Bach and Jamie Rowe of Guardian to record Revival, a new compilation of Whitecross and Guardian tracks and went on a short tour to promote the project.

Members 

Current
 Dave Roberts - lead vocals (2020-present)
 Rex Carroll – guitar, vocals (1985–1993, 2000–present)
 Michael Feighan – drums, vocals (1991–1995, 2000–present)
 Benny Ramos – bass guitar, vocals (2000–present)

Former
 Scott Wenzel − lead vocals (founding member) (1985–2018)
 Mark Hedl − drums (1987–1988)
 Jon Sproule − bass guitar (1987–1988)
 Mike Elliott − guitar (1989)
 Rick Armstrong − bass guitar (1989)
 Butch Dillon − bass guitar (1991)
 Scott Harper − bass guitar (1992–1993)
 Barry Graul − guitar (1994–1995)
 Tracy Ferrie − bass guitar (1994–1995)
 Quinton Gibson − guitar (1996)
 Troy Stone − guitar (1996)
 Brent Denny − bass guitar (1996)
 Peter Stenlund − lead vocals (2019-2020)

Timeline

Albums

With Rex Carroll

Without Rex Carroll

Compilations

Videos
The Reign Goes On - 45 minute VHS, 1992 Star Song Communications

See also

Contemporary Christian music
Glam metal
Heavy metal

References

American Christian metal musical groups
Christian rock groups from Illinois
Heavy metal musical groups from Illinois
Musical groups established in 1985
1985 establishments in Illinois